The 1911–12 Harvard Crimson men's ice hockey season was the 15th season of play for the program.

Season
During the offseason, Harvard had withdrawn from the Intercollegiate Hockey Association. The team had reservations about the policies enacted by the operators of the St. Nicholas Rink, which delayed Harvard's entry into the conference for several years, but new policies forced the program to cease dealing with the rink, Because the IHA schedule was conducted almost entirely at the St. Nicholas Rink, Harvard had to withdraw from the league.

Despite leaving, Harvard scheduled many of their former conference opponents for the 1911–12 season and were able to use their home rink, the Boston Arena, as the venue for most games. The Crimson had narrowly missed out on championships in the previous two seasons and were eager to prove that they were the cream of the college hockey crop. There was also a moment to promote ice hockey from a minor to a major sport for the university. The team's play over the course of the season would go a long way to furthering those efforts, but the Crimson couldn't have started much worse when they lost 1–4 to MIT, though they were missing many of their regular players.

Due to the winter break, the Crimson had almost three weeks before their next game. When they hit the ice they did so against Princeton who now possessed one of, if not the best, player in college hockey, Hobey Baker. Harvard was not daunted, however, and the Crimson defense produced a stalwart  effort. With Gardner between the pipes, Harvard was able to hold back the potent Tiger attack and keep the game knotted at the end of the first half. The defense fought off Princeton in the second half and allowed team captain Huntington to score what proved to be the game-winner. Ten days later the two teams met in a rematch at the Boston Arena. The building was packed to the gills with spectators wanting to see the two best teams in the nation and they were not disappointed. The game progressed as expected with Princeton's mighty offense assailing the stout Crimson defenders, and this time it was the Tigers who ended up as victors with Baker netting the deciding score.

A week later the team played defending champion Cornell in one of the most disorganized performance of the year. The two teams skated to an unsatisfying draw after regulation and when neither could score in the 10-minute overtime, a second sudden-death session was played with Harvard finishing on top from a Duncan shot. This may be the first use of sudden death overtime in an intercollegiate game. Teamwork continued to elude the Crimson in their next contest but their talent allowed them to defeat St. Francis Xavier. When undefeated McGill came to town the Crimson played one of their best games all year and shut out the Reds 3–0.

In their game against Dartmouth the Crimson again played down to their opposition, winning 7–3 despite sloppy play. The team knew they couldn't play that way in the series against Yale to end their season, not if they wanted to win. Once more Harvard's defense was outstanding allowing Gardner and Smart to share the shutout while Sortwell netted his second hat-trick. The second game four days later was played in New Haven under less than ideal circumstances. Sticky ice caused the game to devolve into a disorganized mess and the lack of cohesion allowed Yale to carry the day, winning 3–2 to force a decisive rubber match with Harvard. In their final game the Crimson proved the victors with a 4–2 win. The triumph capped a mostly successful season in which Harvard defeated both the American and Canadian collegiate champions but had no title to call their own.

Roster

Standings

Schedule and Results

|-
!colspan=12 style=";" | Regular Season

Scoring Statistics

Note: Assists were not recorded as a statistic.

References

Harvard Crimson men's ice hockey seasons
Harvard
Harvard
Harvard
Harvard
Harvard